The Montrose Historic District is a historic district comprising fifteen historically significant buildings in the community of Montrose, Alabama. The district is almost entirely residential, with the exception of the 1890 Montrose Post Office. Montrose is located on the eastern shore of Mobile Bay, and several homes in the district occupy bayfront lots. Nine of the homes in the district were designed in the Creole cottage style, a vernacular architectural style popular in the Gulf Coast states. The Creole cottage homes in the district all feature front facades with five bays and recessed full-length front porches supported by square or chamfered columns. Many of the houses were built as summer homes for residents of Mobile, for whom Montrose was a popular vacation destination.

The district was added to the National Register of Historic Places on June 3, 1976.

References

National Register of Historic Places in Baldwin County, Alabama
Buildings and structures in Baldwin County, Alabama
Creole cottage architecture in Alabama
Historic districts in Baldwin County, Alabama
Historic districts on the National Register of Historic Places in Alabama